Pulse is an interbank electronic funds transfer (EFT) network in the United States. It serves more than 4,400 U.S. financial institutions and includes more than 380,000 ATMs, as well as POS terminals nationwide. Rivals of the network include First Data's STAR and Fidelity National Information Services's NYCE. It is owned by Discover Financial, issuer of the Discover Card, and is included in Discover's agreement with China UnionPay; cards can be used on each other's network leading to better acceptance outside large cities than the larger networks.

History

The Pulse system was based on software that operated the Take Your Money Everywhere (TYME) network operating in the central United States. The network was established as the banking rules that limited banks and branches ability to share services were removed. The data processing facilities were originally provided by First City Bank and later transitioned to Texas Commerce Bank.

In 1981, Pulse incorporated and began operating its regional EFT switching facility. In 1995, it launched Pulse Pay, a point-of-sale service where cardholders can use their ATM card at retailers.

Pulse announced acquisition of Gulfnet, the Louisiana-based regional EFT network in 1997 and announced acquisition the Cincinnati-based MoneyStation network in 2000.

Pulse merged with Wisconsin-based Tyme Corporation in 2002, and was acquired by the Discover Financial Services in 2005. Currently, Pulse is a California residential mortgage licensee (License Number MLS-18827).

See also
Interbank network
ATM usage fees

References

External links
Official website

Financial services companies established in 1981
Banking terms
Interbank networks
Financial services companies of the United States
Discover Financial